Statt opp (Maggeduliadei) is the third EP released by the Norwegian band Gåte.

Track listing
"Statt opp (Maggeduliadei)"
"Til deg" (vocal version)
"Bendik og Årolilja" (live)
"Litle fuglen" (demo)

Charts

References

2003 EPs
Gåte albums